|}

The Pinnacle Stakes is a Group 3 flat horse race in Great Britain open to  fillies and mares aged four years or older. It is run at Haydock Park over a distance of 1 mile, 3 furlongs and 175 yards (2,373 metres), and it is scheduled to take place each year in late May or early June.

History
The event was established in 2003, and it was initially classed at Listed level. The inaugural running was won by Albanova.

For several years the Pinnacle Stakes was run in memory of Lady Joan Westbrook, a successful owner and breeder of racehorses, who died in 2004.

The race was promoted to Group 3 status in 2012.

Records
Most successful horse:
 no horse has won this race more than once

Leading jockey (2 wins):
 Neil Callan – Ferdoos (2011), Shimmering Surf (2012)
 Paul Hanagan - Les Fazzani (2010), Miss Marjurie (2015)
 Frankie Dettori - Folk Opera (2008), Journey (2016)
 Jamie Spencer - Arbella (2006), God Given (2018)

Leading trainer (2 wins):
 Roger Varian – Ferdoos (2011), Shimmering Surf (2012)
 John Gosden - Sultanina (2014), Journey (2016)
 Luca Cumani - Pongee (2004), God Given (2018)

Winners

See also
 Horse racing in Great Britain
 List of British flat horse races

References

 Racing Post:
 galopp-sieger.de – Pinnacle Stakes.
 ifhaonline.org – International Federation of Horseracing Authorities – Pinnacle Stakes (2019).
 pedigreequery.com – Pinnacle Stakes – Haydock.

Flat races in Great Britain
Haydock Park Racecourse
Long-distance horse races for fillies and mares
Recurring sporting events established in 2003
2003 establishments in England